Matt Wagner (born October 9, 1961) is an American comics artist and writer who is best known as the creator of the series Mage and Grendel.

Career
Matt Wagner's first published comic book work was Comico Primer #2 (1982), which was the first appearance of Grendel. In addition to his creator-owned series Mage and Grendel, he has worked on comics featuring the Demon and Batman as well as such titles as Sandman Mystery Theatre. In 1991, he illustrated part of the "Season of Mists" story arc in Neil Gaiman's The Sandman series. He wrote and drew Batman/Superman/Wonder Woman: Trinity a limited series featuring DC's three major heroes in 2003. He followed it with Batman and the Monster Men and Batman and the Mad Monk in 2006.

His other projects include Madame Xanadu for Vertigo, with artist Amy Reeder Hadley. He has produced numerous comics covers, including painted ones for Green Arrow and has written several Green Hornet limited series for Dynamite Entertainment.

Outside comics, Wagner provided art for the 1984 Villains & Vigilantes adventure Battle Above the Earth written by Steven Crow.

In April 2022, Wagner was reported among the more than three dozen comics creators who contributed to Operation USA's benefit anthology book, Comics for Ukraine: Sunflower Seeds, a project spearheaded by IDW Publishing Special Projects Editor Scott Dunbier, whose profits would be donated to relief efforts for Ukrainian refugees resulting from the February 2022 Russian invasion of Ukraine. Wagner produced a new Grendel story featuring Hunter Rose for the anthology.

Personal life
As of 2000, Wagner resides in Portland, Oregon with his wife Barbara Schutz (Diana Schutz's sister). Wagner is an atheist.

Awards and nominations
 1988: 
 Nominated for "Best Writer" Eisner Award, for Grendel
 Won an Inkpot Award
 1993:
 Won "Best Finite Series/Limited Series" Eisner Award, for Grendel: War Child
 Nominated for "Best Writer/Artist" Eisner Award, for Batman: Legends of the Dark Knight: "Faces"
 Nominated for "Best Cover Artist" Eisner Award, for Batman: Legends of the Dark Knight: "Faces"
 Nominated for "Best Inker" Eisner Award, for Grendel: War Child
 1995: Nominated for "Best Writer" Eisner Award, for Sandman Mystery Theatre
 1999:
 Won "Best Anthology" Eisner Award, for Grendel: Black, White, and Red
 Won "Best Short Story" Eisner Award, for "Devil's Advocate" in Grendel: Black, White, and Red #1
 Nominated for "Best Writer" Eisner Award, for Grendel: Black, White, and Red

Bibliography

Atomeka Press
 A1 #2 (1989) (story in anthology)

Comic Legends Legal Defense Fund
 The True North #1 (1988)
 The True North II #1 (1991)

Comico
 Grendel #1–3 (1983–1984)
 Grendel vol. 2 #1–40 (1986–1990)
 Mage #1–15 (1984–1986)
 Magebook #1–2 (1985)
 Primer #2, 5 (1982–1983)
 Silverback #1–3 (1989)

Dark Horse Comics

 Dark Horse Presents #40, 45 (1990) (stories in anthology title)
 Dark Horse Presents Fifth Anniversary Special #1 (1991) (story in anthology title)
 Grendel Tales: Devil's Choices #1  (1995)
 Grendel Tales: Devils and Deaths #1 (1994)
 Grendel Tales: Homecoming #1–3  (1994–1995)
 Grendel Tales: The Devil's Hammer #1–2 (1994)
 Grendel: Behold the Devil #0, #1–8 (2007–2008)
 Grendel: Black, White, and Red #1–4 (1998–1999)
 Grendel: Devil's Legacy #1–5 (2000)
 Grendel: War Child #1–10 (1992–1993)
 The Terminator: One Shot (1991)

DC Comics

 Batman vol. 3 #54 (2018)
 The Batman Adventures Annual #1 (1994)
 Batman and the Mad Monk #1–6 (2006–2007)
 Batman and the Monster Men #1–6 (2006)
 Batman Black and White #3 (1996)
 Batman/Grendel #1–2 (1993)
 Batman/Grendel vol. 2 #1–2 (1996)
 Batman: Legends of the Dark Knight #28–30 (1992)
 Batman/Riddler: The Riddle Factory #1 (1995)
 Batman/Superman/Wonder Woman: Trinity #1–3 (2003)
 The Demon vol. 2 #1–4 (1987)
 The Demon vol. 3 #22 (1992)
 Doctor Mid-Nite #1–3 (1999)
 The Sandman #25 (1991)
 Secret Origins Special #1 (Riddler story) (1989)
 Who's Who in the DC Universe #4–6, 8, 16 (1990–1992)
 Who's Who: The Definitive Directory of the DC Universe  #6 (1985)

Vertigo
 House of Mystery Halloween Annual #1–2  (2009–2010)
 Madame Xanadu #1–29 (2008–2011)
 Sandman Midnight Theatre #1 (1995)
 Sandman Mystery Theatre #1–60, Annual #1 (1993–1998)
 Vertigo: Winter's Edge #1 (1998)

Dynamite Entertainment

 Django/Zorro #1–7 (2014–2015)
 Green Hornet: Year One #1–12 (2010–2011)
 Grendel vs. The Shadow (2014)
 The Shadow #100 (2015) (eight page story)
 The Shadow: The Death of Margo Lane (2016)
 The Shadow: Year One #1–10 (2013–2014)
 The Spirit #1–13 (2015–2016)
 Zorro #1–20 (2008–2010)
 Zorro Rides Again #1–12 (2011–2012)

Image Comics
 Mage: The Hero Defined #0–15 (1997–1999)
 Mage: The Hero Denied #0–15 (2017–2019)

Legendary Comics
 The Tower Chronicles: Dreadstalker #1–10 (2014–2015)
 The Tower Chronicles: Geisthawk #1–4 (2012–2013)

Marvel Comics
 Savage Hulk #1 (1996)
 Ultimate Marvel Team-Up #1 (2001)
 Wolverine vol. 2 #9 (one page) (1989)

References

External links

Matt Wagner at Mike's Amazing World of Comics
Matt Wagner at the Unofficial Handbook of Marvel Comics Creators
Matt and Brennan Wagner on the Super Hero Speak podcast from NYCC. 

1961 births
20th-century American artists
21st-century American artists
20th-century atheists
21st-century atheists
American atheists
American comics artists
American comics writers
Artists from Portland, Oregon
Comic book letterers
Comics colorists
Comics inkers
DC Comics people
Inkpot Award winners
Living people
Role-playing game artists
Writers from Portland, Oregon